"Charlie bit my finger - again !", more simply known as "Charlie Bit My Finger" or "Charlie Bit Me", was a 2007 internet viral video famous for being at the time the most viewed YouTube video. As of October 2022, the video received over 897 million views. In May 2021, the video was sold as an NFT at auction for over $700,000. On 24 May, the video was set to Unlisted.

The 56-second-long video, which was uploaded on YouTube in May 2007, features Harry Davies-Carr (aged 3) and Charlie Davies-Carr (aged 1), two brothers from the United Kingdom. Both seated in a chair, Harry puts his finger into Charlie's mouth and gets bitten. He says "Charlie bit me", before putting his finger back into Charlie's mouth, upon which it gets bitten harder. Harry says "ouch" repeatedly, and his brother begins to giggle. Afterwards, Harry smiles and repeats "Charlie bit me. And that really hurt."

On 23 July 2021, the video was set to "Private" due to a change in YouTube policy that automatically marked private all "unlisted" videos dated 31 December 2016 or earlier. YouTube announced the change on 23 June 2021 as a 30-day warning before the change took effect.

The Charlie Bit Me "Official Remix" and "Working With Harry and Charlie" NFTs were auctioned off in May 2021.

Background

Howard Davies-Carr, the father of the boys, said the video was "simply an attempt to capture the boys growing up". While watching the finger-biting scene on his camera after recording it, it "didn't particularly stand out". It was not until he transferred the video onto his computer a few weeks later and played it again that he found it to be comedic.

The Davies-Carr family lives in the United Kingdom. Howard uploaded the video onto YouTube so that it could be watched by the boys' godfather, who was living in the United States. He chose YouTube because the size of the video file was so big that it could not be sent by email. Originally the video was set to private and he mentions, "I was just about to remove (the video) before it exploded. But once it had (exploded) I had lost control of the clip anyway so I left it." Howard commented on the video: "The clip only went up as I wanted to share it with the boys' godfather. I was naive about the whole YouTube thing. It became viral and once that happened there was nothing I could do. People have sent lovely comments and messages and I now upload a new video of the boys every six weeks."

Views
"Charlie Bit My Finger" had received 2.6 million views on YouTube by the start of February 2008 and 12 million views by March 2008. In December 2008, it was the twelfth most viewed video on YouTube with 65 million views. By April 2009, the video had received 92 million hits. It became the second most viewed video in August 2009, and took over the title as the most viewed video ever at the end of October 2009, when it surpassed Evolution of Dance. By November 2009, "Charlie Bit My Finger – Again!" had received over 130 million views. In addition to being the most viewed, it was also the "most favourited" and the second "most discussed" video on the website in the United Kingdom. In a May 2009 report compiled by Visible Measures, which measures video hits across 150 video-sharing websites, "Charlie Bit My Finger" was the thirteenth most viewed viral video on the Internet. 

By the end of 2011, it had been surpassed by music videos Justin Bieber's "Baby", Lady Gaga's "Bad Romance", Eminem feat. Rihanna's "Love the Way You Lie", Shakira's "Waka Waka (This Time for Africa)" and Jennifer Lopez feat. Pitbull's "On the Floor", becoming the 6th most viewed video on YouTube. Despite being able to regain its position to number 3 (and becoming the third YouTube video to reach 800 million views), it has been since surpassed by many other videos, dropping out of 30 most viewed YouTube videos. As of December 2020, the video had reached 878 million views, with over 2 million likes.

Legacy
As a result of the video's inadvertent fame, the boys gained recognition. Following the video, multiple clips were uploaded by their father to YouTube. They feature Jasper, the third child in the family. Shelley Davies-Carr, their mother, commented on the success: "Susan Boyle has never had the hits we have had. The video got on to a college networking site in the U.S. and from there it went viral. I think the British accents have helped make it so globally viewed." According to a 2008 interview with Shelley, the boys feel embarrassed when they see themselves on television. She also noted that in 2008 they were "shy about their new fame." Howard commented in 2009 that his sons "are now almost legendary. People want their autographs, it's just crazy."

In their list of YouTube's 50 greatest viral videos, Time ranked "Charlie Bit My Finger" as number one.

The video's lasting impact was underscored by the Davies-Carr family's appearance as mystery guests on Channel 4's Big Fat Quiz of the '00s on 30 September 2012. Among the references to the video includes an episode of the U.S. television series The Office.

In a 2012 interview Howard Davies-Carr discussed the pitfalls of his sons' accidental fame saying, "There are an awful lot of unscrupulous people out there who will try and take advantage of people that don't understand what they have." When it comes to the topic of the boys getting older, the boys' father has reflected, "When the boys get to 18, I'd like them to think back and think, 'O.K., I've got something in my life which is more than just what I was when I did the 'Charlie Bit Me' video."

The parents have passed on invitations to talk shows and on making public appearances in media outlets.

In 2014, during his "After The Oscars Special" on Jimmy Kimmel Live!, Jimmy Kimmel enlisted the help of many big-name celebrities to showcase some of YouTube's greatest videos. The first video to be showcased was "Charlie Bit My Finger" and was parodied in a video entitled "Bitman Begins" and featured Tom Hanks, Meryl Streep, and brothers Chris & Liam Hemsworth. Chris played the role of Harry, while Liam played the role of Charlie. The video was a mock trailer for a film featuring the actors. The climactic scene takes place on the roof of a building where Harry wants revenge on Charlie for biting his finger. "Harry" screams the line "Charlie bit me, Charlie bit my finger!" They fall off the roof onto the street below. "Harry" then utters the famous line "Ouch Charlie, that really hurt" while "Charlie" just laughs.

In an April 2015 interview, Charlie said he thought it was "a bit odd that loads of people have watched it." Also according to the interview, Charlie and Harry's parents have made "thousands" from the video through advertising and sponsorship.

The Davies-Carr family now includes two additional sons, Jasper and Rupert.

Osama bin Laden, the founder of Al-Qaeda, had the video in his computer's audio/visual collection.

A sound clip from the video is featured in "Pulse 8", the first track of the 2015 album Integrity by grime MC Jme.

Auction 
In May 2021, it was reported that the video would be auctioned off as an NFT, and that following the auction, the video would be removed from YouTube. The winner of the auction, with a top bid of $760,999, was 3F Music – a company which also owns NFTs corresponding to the Disaster Girl and Overly Attached Girlfriend internet memes. Following the auction, it was announced that the buyer had decided that the video should remain on YouTube, however as of August 2022 the video remains unavailable to public eyes.

Financial impact
It was reported that in 2011 the family made over £100,000 in advertising revenue from the video. The profit from the video was enough that the family could afford to purchase a new house.

Their success has been compared to winning a lottery, a so-called "meme lottery". Since the "Charlie Bit My Finger" video was posted, other videos of babies have gone "viral" on YouTube and the families are monetising them, often making over US$100,000.

In response to requests from viewers online, the family created "Charlie Bit My Finger" T-shirts, mugs and limited edition calendars.

The family signed into a partnership with Viral Spiral, a viral meme video management company specialising in viral videos, which has helped place the viral video in meme advertisements for companies like Sprint and helped to create a viral meme brand. There was also news of a web series featuring the boys in the works. , no information has been released since the initial announcement in 2012.

See also

David After Dentist
Laughing Baby
List of Internet phenomena
List of most-viewed YouTube videos
Viral video

References

External links
 
 

2007 in the United Kingdom
British video bloggers
May 2007 events in Europe
Viral videos
Internet memes introduced in 2007
2007 YouTube videos